David "Dai" Maldwyn Davies (2 May 1925 – 25 September 2003) was a  and British Lions international rugby union player.

Davies made his debut for Wales on 21 January 1950 versus England and was selected for the 1950 British Lions tour to New Zealand and Australia. He played club rugby for Somerset Police.

References 

1925 births
2003 deaths
Barbarian F.C. players
British & Irish Lions rugby union players from Wales
British police officers
Penygraig RFC players
Rugby union hookers
Rugby union players from Penygraig
Wales international rugby union players
Welsh rugby union players